Dasht-e Qureh (also Romanized as Dasht-e Qūreh; also known as Dasht-e Qūrī and Dasht Qūrī) is a village in Beygom Qaleh Rural District, in the Central District of Naqadeh County, West Azerbaijan Province, Iran. At the 2006 census, its population was 610, in 93 families.

References 

Populated places in Naqadeh County